Ari Gold (born 1970) is an American filmmaker, and musician. His short film Helicopter was about the aftermath of his mother Melissa Dilworth Gold's 1991 death. His feature debut Adventures of Power premiered at the 2008 Sundance Film Festival and made its European debut at the 2008 Karlovy Vary International Film Festival.

Early life 
Ari Gold was born in 1970 as son of writer Herbert Gold and Melissa Gold (née Dilworth) in San Francisco, California. His twin brother is musician Ethan Gold, and he has a sister Nina Gold. He also has two half-sisters from his father's first marriage. His mother, Melissa Dilworth, is the daughter of J. Richardson Dilworth, a longtime financial advisor of the Rockefeller family.

He attended New York University (NYU) to study film, and Columbia University, graduating in 1992.

Career 
The Song of Sway Lake (2017) was co-written and directed by Gold, the story centers on Ollie (Rory Culkin), a record collector who, with a friend, Nikolai (Robert Sheehan), makes a furtive trip to his family’s lakefront summer home in Upstate New York, months after where Ollie’s father committed suicide in the icy lake.

Adventures of Power (2008) was written and directed by Ari Gold, and is a cult comedy about a mine worker (played by Gold) who discovers an underground subculture of air-drummers that has the power to change the world. Gold approached the publicity for the release of Adventures of Power online (which was uncommon in 2008), by posting exclusive behind-the-scenes footage and many film clips to his channel in order to gather views.

Helicopter (2001, copyrighted 2000) is a short film dealing with the aftermath of the death of his mother Melissa in the 1991 Vallejo helicopter crash that also took the life of rock impresario Bill Graham and pilot Steve Kahn. An experimental narrative combining animated sequences and live action, the film was awarded in 2000 the Student Academy Award Oscar and he also won awards at SXSW Film Festival and a number of other film festivals.

Culture (1999), which Gold directed and starred in, is a 60-second short film, shot entirely in one take with no rehearsal. Gold followed set of self-imposed rules while making the film, including “only black, white, & primary colors may be used” and “the camera must not move.” Culture premiered in the United States at the 1999 Sundance Film Festival, and Reel.com called it “the best sixty seconds of film” at that festival. Although Culture has no dialogue, it offers a commentary on contemporary film and television.

The comedic short Frog Crossing (1996), which Gold co-directed with Jamie Babbit (But I'm a Cheerleader), has screened at Sundance Film Festival and was named Best Short at San Antonio Underground Film Festival. In the film, Gold plays a hippie standing by the side of a road, trying to protect the frogs crossing the road during their mating season. Gold's sister Nina also stars in the film.

Some of Ari's more unusual distinctions include winning High Times Magazine’s "Stoner of the Year" award (2001). He's also enshrined in the Guinness Book of World Records for commanding the largest air-drum ensemble on earth.

Filmography

Feature films

Short films

Music 
Gold is an occasional member of two comedic music projects with The Brothers Gold, with his brother Ethan Gold on guitar; Ari sings and plays ukulele.

Gold also sings in the new wave folk band, The Honey Brothers. The Honey Brothers started small in 2001, a few college friends singing for people on the street corners of New York. Since then, they have released two studio albums, one live album, and made a guest appearance on the TV show, 90210. The other core members of The Honey Brothers are Andrew Vladeck, Daniel Posner, and Adrian Grenier. Ethan Gold is a former member of the band, in 2010 he was replaced by Dan Green.

References

External links
 Official site
 
 The Honey Brothers
 The Gold Brothers

1970 births
Living people
American male pop singers
American ukulele players
American male actors
Film directors from San Francisco
Columbia College (New York) alumni